Hazi Aslanov (commonly described as Azi Aslanov and A. A. Aslanov, January 22, 1910 – January 24, 1945) was  Azerbaijani major-general of the Soviet armoured troops during World War II. He was awarded the Hero of the Soviet Union title twice. The second Hero title was posthumously awarded on July 12, 1991, by Mikhail Gorbachev, at the constant recommendations by Heydar Aliyev.

Early years
Hazi Aslanov was born in a worker family on January 22, 1910, in Lankaran, Azerbaijan. When he lost his father at the age of 13, he left local school number 1 and worked in the Lankaran Brick Plant.

In 1929, Aslanov graduated from the Transcaucasian Preparatory Military School in Baku and continued his education at Leningrad Cavalry School, where he passed courses at the Military Academy of Armored Forces.

After graduation, in June 1931 he was appointed commander of a 15th Cavalry Regiment platoon of 3rd Cavalry Division Bessarabia named after Grigory Kotovsky. In June, 1933, he was appointed commander of the separate tank company. In 1937, he joined the Communist Party of the Soviet Union. Aslanov also served as deputy commander for the technical part of company, commander of 2nd Rifle Division and 60th Rifle Divisions, followed by motor transport battalion of the Kiev Military District, where he attained the rank of captain in February 1939.

Battles

Winter War
He served during the 1939 Soviet invasion of Poland and fought in the Karelian Isthmus, then took part in the breaking of the Mannerheim Line during the Winter War. He was promoted to major in November 1940.

Battle of Moscow
In August 1941, he replaced the injured commander of a tank battalion, composed of 12-15 machines type T-26, BT-5, BT-7 and T-34. 

In the fierce battles near Shostka, Bakhmach and Pyriatyn, his tank commanders fought to the last tank, while Aslanov personally led his battalion in the attack. In one of these battles, Aslanov received two bullet wounds in his right leg and a severe shrapnel wound to the head, but despite these injuries, he continued to fight. When the battalion lost all of its tanks, he was recalled to the reserve in September 1941. He was also appointed 10th Deputy for the technical units, where he fought in Pyriatyn, Okhtyrka, Bohodukhiv and Kharkiv. The next year, he was appointed to the command of the 55th Tank Regiment.

Battle of Stalingrad
Later in 1942, he led the 35th Guards Tank Brigade from Stalingrad through Borisovo, Vileyka, and Minsk to Vilnius and Riga, and participated in the battles of Rostov and Taganrog. His brigade liberated the town of Pleshinitsy. Aslanov was famous for his "thrust from flank" technique, which involved launching an attack by heading straight toward the enemy, while other Soviet troops were sent to attack from the sides.

Death
 
On January 24, 1945, near Priekule in the Liepāja District in Latvia during a reconnaissance, Aslanov was seriously wounded and died five and a half hours later on the battlefield. He was posthumously awarded the Order of the Patriotic War, 1st degree, for his leadership of the Tank Brigade.

Awards and honors
Aslanov received his first star in 1943 for his performance at Stalingrad. The second was supposed to be given for the crossing of the Berezina river, under the recommendation of General of the Army Ivan Chernyakhovsky, but he received it posthumously, 46 years later, in 1991, after a special appeal by Azerbaijani intelligentsia to Mikhail Gorbachev.

Wound stripe

A subway station, school, oil tanker and a streets in Baku, Imishli and Volgograd, monument in Vialejka were named after him. The village in Agstafa region carries his name and his house museum functions in Lankaran. A special granite memorial plate was constructed in memory of him on Mamayev Kurgan.

The bust of Hazi Aslanov was unveiled in the settlement of Baku named after him. The Army Ideological and Cultural Center of the Ministry of Defence of Azerbaijan is named after Aslanov.

Gallery

References

 Герои Советского Союза: Краткий биографический словарь (Heroes of the Soviet Union: A Brief Biographical Dictionary). V.1. Moscow: Voenizdat, 1987.
 Золотые Звезды Азербайджана. Баку, 1975.

1910 births
1945 deaths
People from Lankaran
People from Baku Governorate
Communist Party of the Soviet Union members
Soviet major generals
Azerbaijani generals
People of the Soviet invasion of Poland
Soviet military personnel of the Winter War
Soviet military personnel of World War II from Azerbaijan
Azerbaijani military personnel killed in action
Soviet military personnel killed in World War II
Heroes of the Soviet Union
Recipients of the Order of the Red Banner
Recipients of the Order of Suvorov, 2nd class
Recipients of the Order of Alexander Nevsky
Recipients of the Medal "For Courage" (Russia)
Recipients of the Order of the Red Star